The City Council Cemetery Land Scandal is a scandal that in March 2010, resulted in the Kenyan Deputy Prime Minister Musalia Mudavadi coming under investigation by the Kenya Anti-Corruption Commission over a Sh283 million cemetery land fraud at the Nairobi City Council. Commission officials said that they wanted to establish whether the minister was party to the fraud in which the City Council of Nairobi bought land valued at Sh24 million for nearly Sh300 million. Mudavadi however protested his innocence and said that the commission was being unfair by accusing him without giving him a chance to be heard. Investigations are currently ongoing into the matter.

In 2016, a high court in Kenya established that Musalia Mudavadi did not receive any funds from the scandal neither was he involved in any way in the conspiracy that led to the scandal thus he was not culpable in any way.

References

Politics of Kenya
2010 in Kenya
2010 in law
Law of Kenya
Corruption in Kenya